Bob Bryan and Mike Bryan were the defending champions but lost in the quarterfinals to Wayne Arthurs and Paul Hanley.

James Blake and Mark Merklein won in the final 6–4, 6–7(2–7), 7–6(7–5) against Lleyton Hewitt and Mark Philippoussis.

Seeds

  Mark Knowles /  Daniel Nestor (semifinals)
  Bob Bryan /  Mike Bryan (quarterfinals)
  Donald Johnson /  Jared Palmer (quarterfinals)
  Chris Haggard /  Brian MacPhie (first round)

Draw

External links
 Doubles draw

Tennis Channel Open
2003 ATP Tour
2003 Tennis Channel Open